Han Yu (born 1992) is a Chinese professional pool player. She is a three time WPA World Nine-ball Championship women's champion, winning the event in 2013, 2016 and 2018. Han is also a semi-finalist in three further world championships, in 2017 in the nine-ball event, and 2011 and 2014 in ten-ball.

Career
Han first appeared at a pool event in 2007, and reached the semi-finals of the All Japan Championship, before winning the event in 2009. In 2011, Han reached the semi-final of the WPA World Ten-ball Championship, losing to winner Kelly Fisher 9–4, and later in the year lost again in the semi-final of the All Japan Championship to Bi Zhu-Qing.

In 2013, Han became a world champion for the first time, winning the WPA World Nine-ball Championship. She defeated Fisher and Tan Ho-yun to reach the final, where she defeated Yuan-chun Lin 9–1. After winning the championships, Han began to pack up her cue, and did not celebrate. Han was then surrounded by fans asking for autographs and photographs, and broke into tears when her mother arrived. The following year, Han reached the semi-finals of the WPA World Ten-ball Championship, but lost to Kelly Fisher again.

In 2016, Han reached the semi-finals of the Amway Cup and was defeated 8–9 there by the eventual champion, Chezka Centeno. Two months later, she completed a 9–8 final victory over Liu Shasha in the China Open. In December 2016, Han won her second world championship with a 9–7 victory in the final against Chihiro Kawahara. Han won her third world championship in 2018, winning the nine-ball final over Wang Xiao Tong.

Han Yu was picked as eighth seed for the 2019 World Pool Masters, missing the preliminary round but lost 6–7 to Shane Van Boening in the first round.

Achievements
 2009 All Japan Championship 9-Ball
 2013 WPA Women's World Nine-ball Championship
 2014 China Open 9-Ball Championship
 2016 WPA Women's World Nine-ball Championship
 2016 China Open 9-Ball Championship
 2016 Billiards Digest Player of the Year
 2018 WPA Women's World Nine-ball Championship
 2018 CBSA World Chinese Eight-ball Championship 
 2018 AZBilliards Player of the Year
 2019 All Japan Championship 9-Ball

References

External links

 Han Yu at propool.info

Date of birth missing (living people)
Chinese pool players
Female pool players
Living people
Place of birth missing (living people)
1992 births